is a retired Japanese freestyle swimmer. He competed in the 100 m and 4×200 m relay events at the 1952 and 1956 Olympics and won two silver medals in 1952. In the 100 m event in the 1952 Olympics, Hiroshi actually posted an identical time to the eventual gold medal winner, Clarke Scholes of the US. Officials used a judges decision to award Clarke Scholes the gold medal and Hiroshi Suzuki the silver medal. He won gold medals in these two events at the 1954 Asian Games.

References

1933 births
Living people
Swimmers at the 1952 Summer Olympics
Swimmers at the 1956 Summer Olympics
Olympic swimmers of Japan
Olympic silver medalists for Japan
World record setters in swimming
Japanese male freestyle swimmers
Asian Games medalists in swimming
Swimmers at the 1954 Asian Games
Medalists at the 1952 Summer Olympics
Olympic silver medalists in swimming
Asian Games gold medalists for Japan
Medalists at the 1954 Asian Games